The twenty-fourth season of British science fiction television series Doctor Who began on 7 September 1987 with Sylvester McCoy's first story Time and the Rani, and ended with Dragonfire. John Nathan-Turner produced the series, with Andrew Cartmel script editing.

Production
Colin Baker (contracted for four years starting in 1985) was originally due to reprise his role as the Sixth Doctor prior to his dismissal at the request of Michael Grade, who said that a 24th season would only happen if a new actor took the title role. Baker was offered the chance to film a single four-part story ending in his character's demise, but he declined (as he did not want to miss out on other work in the meantime), instead offering to do the entirety of the season and leave the show at its conclusion. The BBC never responded to his letter. Had Baker reprised his role, a story featuring the Sixth Doctor and Mel properly meeting for the first time was going to open the season.

A new logo for the series was introduced with this season along with a new opening credits sequence that moved away from the "starfield" motif introduced in 1980, as producer John Nathan-Turner thought it was time for the series to have a brand new look. As with the opening sequence from the Sixth Doctor era, the Seventh Doctor's opening does not use a static image of the Doctor, but rather one with limited animation: the image of the Doctor starts as a scowl, then fades to a wink followed by a smile. McCoy wears makeup that gives his face and hair a silver/grey appearance. Episode four of Time and the Rani mistakenly uses an early version of this sequence, which gives the Doctor's face a shadowy look which producer John Nathan-Turner felt was not prominent enough.

Music
Keff McCulloch arranged the new opening theme. It was used until the end of the regular run of the series. The new theme arrangement marked the first time since the early part of the Second Doctor's era that the theme's "middle eight" section was regularly heard during the opening credits (the previous two arrangements used the middle eight during the closing credits only).

Casting

Main cast 
 Sylvester McCoy as the Seventh Doctor
 Bonnie Langford as Mel Bush
 Sophie Aldred as Ace

New Companion
The departure of Bonnie Langford saw plans to introduce a new companion. However, owing to Langford being undecided as to when she would actually leave the show, producer John Nathan-Turner asked writers Malcolm Kohll and Ian Briggs to formulate characters that could be used as potential companions. Kohll designed a character in his script, titled The Flight of the Chimeron (eventually to take shape as Delta and the Bannermen), called Ray. Initially, it appeared that The Flight of the Chimeron would be the final serial of the season, which would see Ray leave with the Doctor. However, by the time it came to production and scheduling for the season, Kohll's serial had been swapped in the running order with Ian Briggs' (which became Dragonfire), and led to Briggs' creation, who eventually became Ace, taking Mel's place with the Doctor.

Recurring stars 
 Kate O'Mara as the Rani

Kate O'Mara makes her second appearance as the Rani in McCoy's first serial Time and the Rani.

Guest stars
Sophie Aldred guest stars as Ace in Dragonfire; Ace joins the Doctor at the end of this story to become his companion throughout the next two seasons.

Tony Selby, having recently appeared in The Trial of a Time Lord, also made a guest appearance as Sabalom Glitz in the same story.

Serials 

Andrew Cartmel takes over as script editor. This season is moved to a Monday schedule.

The previous season, while ostensibly a single 14-part serial, was divided into three stories of four episodes and one of two episodes. For this season, this was re-jigged into a new format that would be followed over the next three years, with a pair of four-parters and a pair of three-parters. Not including The Two Doctors, which had episodes of 45-minute duration, Delta and the Bannermen was the first standard format (25-minute) 3 part serial since Planet of Giants in Season 2.

Broadcast
The entire season was broadcast from 7 September to 7 December 1987. Transmission for this season moved to Monday nights. In this way, BBC1 scheduled it against Coronation Street on ITV, ensuring ratings struggles.

Home media

VHS releases

DVD and Blu-ray releases

In print

References

Bibliography

 

1987 British television seasons
Season 24
Season 24
24